Francis B. Keene (1856–1945) was a United States diplomat and a politician in the State of Wisconsin.

Biography
Keene was born Francis Bowler Keene on December 11, 1856 to Rev. David Keene and Susan Elizabeth (Bowler) Keene in Milwaukee, Wisconsin. On November 8, 1893 he married Emerin Price Semple (1857–1936). He died in 1945 in Italy and is interred at the Campo Cestio cemetery in Rome.

Career
Keene was a member of the Wisconsin State Assembly from 1899 to 1901 sessions. From 1903 to 1905 he served as U.S. Consul in Florence, Italy, and in Geneva, Switzerland from 1905 to 1915. He served as U.S. Consul General in Zurich, Switzerland from 1915 to 1917, followed by Rome, Italy from 1917 to 1924. Aside from politics, he worked as an engineer, a coal sales agent, and a newspaper editor. Keene was a Republican.

References

External links
The Political Graveyard

1856 births
1945 deaths
American consuls
Republican Party members of the Wisconsin State Assembly
Politicians from Milwaukee